Kilkhorthang Gewog (Dzongkha: དཀྱིལ་འཁོར་ཐང་) is a gewog (village block) of Tsirang District, Bhutan.

References 

Gewogs of Bhutan
Tsirang District